Hotell Kantarell is a Swedish TV series mainly aimed at children.

Plot 
The story focuses on the receptionist glow worm Lucia, the ever optimistic bumble bee Marimba and the resident guest grasshopper Åke T Grönqvist and uses a Hotel in a Cantharellus (mushroom) as a backdrop. Live action guests check in and stir up drama for the characters.

Sources 
""Mupparna"på svenska ny barnserie" - Article in Sydsvenskan

External links 
 

2007 Swedish television series debuts
Swedish television shows featuring puppetry
Swedish children's television series
2000s Swedish television series